Johann Georg Wirsung (July 3, 1589 Augsburg – August 22, 1643 Padua) was a German anatomist who was a long-time prosector in Padua.

He is remembered for the discovery of the pancreatic duct ("duct of Wirsung") during the dissection of a man who had been recently hanged for murder. Instead of publishing the results of his discovery, he engraved a sketch of the duct on a copper plate, from which he made several imprints, and subsequently had them delivered to leading anatomists throughout Europe.

Wirsung was murdered in 1643 by Giacomo Cambier, reportedly the result of an argument as to who was the discoverer of the pancreatic duct. Five years after Wirsung's death, a former student of his, Moritz Hoffman (1622-1698) claimed that it was he, not Wirsung, who was the actual discoverer of the duct.

Bibliography
 Giuseppe Ongaro, Wirsung a Padova 1629–1643, Treviso, Antilia, 2010, pp. 291

References
 Johann George Wirsung @ Who Named It

German anatomists
1589 births
1643 deaths
Physicians from Augsburg
Emigrants from the Holy Roman Empire to the Republic of Venice